Niyeh (also Romanized as Nīyeh and Neyeh; also known as Nīr) is a village in Tarq Rud Rural District, in the Central District of Natanz County, Isfahan Province, Iran. At the 2006 census, its population was 373, in 123 families.

References 

Populated places in Natanz County